The 2017 Italian Open (also known as the 2017 Rome Masters and the sponsored title 2017 Internazionali BNL d'Italia) was a tennis tournament played on outdoor clay courts at the Foro Italico in Rome, Italy. It was the 74th edition of the Italian Open and is classified as an ATP World Tour Masters 1000 event on the 2017 ATP World Tour and a Premier 5 event on the 2017 WTA Tour. It took place from 15–21 May 2017.

Points and prize money

Point distribution

Prize money

ATP main draw entrants

Singles

Seeds
The following are the seeded players. Seedings are based on ATP rankings as of 8 May 2017. Rankings and points before are as of 15 May 2017.

Because the tournament took place one week later than in 2016, the points defended from last year was not superseded within a 52-week run, the results during the 52-week period were from 2016 Geneva Open and 2016 Open de Nice Côte d'Azur. 

† The player did not qualify for the tournament in 2016. Accordingly, points for his 18th best result are deducted instead.

Other entrants
The following players received wildcards into the main draw:
  Matteo Berrettini
  Gianluca Mager
  Stefano Napolitano
  Andreas Seppi

The following player received entry using a protected ranking:
  Tommy Haas

The following players received entry from the qualifying draw:
  Nicolás Almagro
  Kevin Anderson
  Aljaž Bedene
  Carlos Berlocq
  Adrian Mannarino
  Thiago Monteiro
  Jan-Lennard Struff

The following players received entry as lucky losers:
  Thomaz Bellucci
  Alexandr Dolgopolov
  Jared Donaldson
  Ernesto Escobedo

Withdrawals
Before the tournament
  Marcos Baghdatis →replaced by  Jared Donaldson
  Roger Federer →replaced by  Dan Evans
  Richard Gasquet →replaced by  Florian Mayer
  Steve Johnson →replaced by  Kyle Edmund
  Ivo Karlović →replaced by  Ernesto Escobedo
  Philipp Kohlschreiber →replaced by  Thomaz Bellucci
  Nick Kyrgios →replaced by  Alexandr Dolgopolov
  Paolo Lorenzi →replaced by  Nicolas Mahut
  Gaël Monfils →replaced by  Robin Haase
  Gilles Müller →replaced by  Ryan Harrison
  Jo-Wilfried Tsonga →replaced by  Jiří Veselý

Retirements
  Nicolás Almagro
  Gianluca Mager

Doubles

Seeds

 Rankings are as of May 8, 2017.

Other entrants
The following pairs received wildcards into the doubles main draw:
  Simone Bolelli /  Andreas Seppi
  Federico Gaio /  Stefano Napolitano

The following pair received entry as alternates:
  Treat Huey /  Michael Venus

Withdrawals
Before the tournament
  Nick Kyrgios

WTA main draw entrants

Singles

Seeds

Rankings are as of May 8, 2017.

Other entrants
The following players received wildcards into the main draw:
  Deborah Chiesa
  Sara Errani
  Maria Sharapova

The following players received entry from the qualifying draw:
  Mona Barthel
  Catherine Bellis
  Daria Gavrilova
  Anett Kontaveit
  Jeļena Ostapenko
  Andrea Petkovic
  Donna Vekić
  Wang Qiang

Withdrawals
Before the tournament
  Ana Konjuh →replaced by  Yaroslava Shvedova
  Agnieszka Radwańska →replaced by  Monica Niculescu
  Coco Vandeweghe →replaced by  Misaki Doi
  Caroline Wozniacki →replaced by  Naomi Osaka

Retirements
  Daria Kasatkina
  Garbiñe Muguruza
  Maria Sharapova

Doubles

Seeds

 Rankings are as of May 8, 2017.

Other entrants
The following pairs received wildcards into the doubles main draw:
  Deborah Chiesa /  Stefania Rubini
  Sara Errani /  Martina Trevisan
  Jelena Janković /  Andrea Petkovic

The following pair received entry as alternates:
  Olga Savchuk /  Elina Svitolina

Withdrawals
Before the tournament
  Daria Kasatkina

Champions

Men's singles
 
  Alexander Zverev def.  Novak Djokovic 6–4, 6–3

Women's singles
  
  Elina Svitolina def.  Simona Halep, 4–6, 7–5, 6–1

Men's doubles
 
  Pierre-Hugues Herbert /  Nicolas Mahut def.  Ivan Dodig /  Marcel Granollers, 4–6, 6–4, [10–3]

Women's doubles
  
  Chan Yung-jan /  Martina Hingis def.  Ekaterina Makarova /  Elena Vesnina, 7–5, 7–6(7–4)

References

External links
Official website